Podvyazye is a rural locality (a village) in Tolpukhovskoye Rural Settlement, Sobinsky District, Vladimir Oblast, Russia. The population was 5 as of 2010.

Geography 
Podvyazye is located 37 km north of Sobinka (the district's administrative centre) by road. Bukholovo is the nearest rural locality.

References 

Rural localities in Sobinsky District